Rostislav Mstislavich (c. 1110–1167), Kniaz' (Prince) of Smolensk (1125–1160), Novgorod (1154) and Grand Prince of Kiev (1154, 1159–1167). He was the son of Mstislav I of Kiev and Christina Ingesdotter of Sweden.

After Yaroslav II of Kiev was driven out of Novgorod, Rostislav was invited to become the ruler of Novgorod. He accepted, and became the prince on April 17, 1154. Then, learning that Iziaslav II had died, Rostislav left Novgorod to take the Kievan throne. Indignant that their prince had abandoned them and angered that "he did not make order among them, but tore them more apart", the citizens of Novgorod drove out Rostislav's son, David, who was their governor. They replaced him with Mstislav Yurievich, the son of Yury Dolgoruky.

Rostislav ruled Kiev for one week before Iziaslav III of Kiev forced him to flee to Chernigov.

He left four sons, princes David Rostislavich of Novgorod, Mstislav Rostislavich of Smolensk, Roman I of Kiev and Rurik Rostislavich and two daughters Elena Rostislavna of Kiev-Smolensk (died 1204) and Agrafena Rostislavna (died 1237).

Sources
 The Chronicle of Novgorod PDF file

1110s births
1167 deaths
Rostislavichi family (Smolensk)
Princes of Smolensk
Princes of Novgorod
Grand Princes of Kiev
12th-century princes in Kievan Rus'
Eastern Orthodox monarchs

Year of birth uncertain